Notukeu was a provincial electoral division  for the Legislative Assembly of the province of Saskatchewan, Canada, located south of Old Wives Lake. This district was created before the 3rd provincial election in 1912 as "Pinto Creek", after the rural municipality and the creek that flows through it. Redrawn and renamed "Notukeu" for the 1917 provincial election, the constituency was dissolved and combined with the Willow Bunch district (as Notukeu-Willow Bunch) before the 9th provincial election in 1938.

It is now part of the Wood River constituency.

Members of the Legislative Assembly

Election results

|-

 
|Conservative
|Joseph Arthur Marcotte
|align="right"|332
|align="right"|43.00%
|align="right"|–
|- bgcolor="white"
!align="left" colspan=3|Total
!align="right"|772
!align="right"|100.00%
!align="right"|

|-

 
|Conservative
|Joseph Arthur Marcotte
|align="right"|872
|align="right"|27.89%
|align="right"|-15.11
|- bgcolor="white"
!align="left" colspan=3|Total
!align="right"|3,127
!align="right"|100.00%
!align="right"|

|-

|- bgcolor="white"
!align="left" colspan=3|Total
!align="right"|Acclamation
!align="right"|

|-

|- bgcolor="white"
!align="left" colspan=3|Total
!align="right"|2,240
!align="right"|100.00%
!align="right"|

|-

|Independent
|Andrew Graham McCaw
|align="right"|1,036
|align="right"|33.27%
|align="right"|–
|- bgcolor="white"
!align="left" colspan=3|Total
!align="right"|3,114
!align="right"|100.00%
!align="right"|

|-

 
|Conservative
|John Wilkinson
|align="right"|2,293
|align="right"|45.37%
|align="right"|-
|- bgcolor="white"
!align="left" colspan=3|Total
!align="right"|5,054
!align="right"|100.00%
!align="right"|

|-

 
|Conservative
|P. M. McKinnon
|align="right"|1,560
|align="right"|29.69%
|align="right"|-15.68

|Farmer-Labour
|Conrad Rieder
|align="right"|1,499
|align="right"|28.52%
|align="right"|–
|- bgcolor="white"
!align="left" colspan=3|Total
!align="right"|5,255
!align="right"|100.00%
!align="right"|

See also
Electoral district (Canada)
List of Saskatchewan provincial electoral districts
List of Saskatchewan general elections
List of political parties in Saskatchewan
Old Wives Lake

References
 Saskatchewan Archives Board – Saskatchewan Election Results By Electoral Division

Former provincial electoral districts of Saskatchewan